Raszewo Dworskie  is a village in the administrative district of Gmina Czerwińsk nad Wisłą, within Płońsk County, Masovian Voivodeship, in east-central Poland.

The village was administratively part of the Płock voivodeship from 1975 to 1998.

The village was first mentioned in 1402 as belonging to the Kobylniki parish, a noble property.

References

Raszewo Dworskie